Finally is the debut album of American singer-songwriter, Sean Ensign. It was released in 2006 on the label, Titan Sounds. Every song was co-written by Ensign himself, with the exception of "Everytime It Rains", a cover of the Ace of Base song. Includes the singles, "It's My Life (Finally)", "Without You" and "Everytime It Rains."

Track listings
 "It's My Life (Finally)"
 "Without You"
 "Feel So Good"
 "Turn Back"
 "Inevitable"
 "I Can't Deny"
 "Put Your Hands On Me"
 "It's Just Sex"
 "Everytime It Rains"
 "I Wanna Be With You"
 "Without You" (Hex Hector Radio Mix)
 "It's My Life (Finally)" (Mike Cruz Radio Mix)
 "Turn Back" (High Energy Mix)
 "It's Just Sex" (Seduction Mix)
 "Everytime It Rains"

Reloaded Edition

 "Amazing"
 "Turn Back"
 "I Wanna Be With You"
 "It's My Life (Finally)"
 "Disappear"
 "Put Your Hands On Me"
 "Feels So Good"
 "It's Just Sex"
 "I Can't Deny"
 "Fly Away"
 "Without You" 
 "Everytime It Rains"
 "Inevitable"
 "You Keep Me Hangin' On"
 "I Wanna Be With You" (Shanghai Surprise Radio Edit)
 "It's My Life (Finally)" (Electric Allstars Radio Edit)
 "Feels So Good" (Hex Hector Radio Edit)
 "Without You" (Electric Allstars Radio Edit)
 "Everytime It Rains" (Unplugged)

2006 debut albums
Sean Ensign albums